This is a list of notable lakes in India.

Andhra Pradesh 

 Kolleru Lake
 Kondakarla Ava
 Kaniairi Lake
 Cumbum
 Pulicat Lake

Assam

Dora Beel
Urpad Beel
Samaguri Beel
Morikalang Beel
Haflong Lake
Sivasagar Lake
Joysagar Lake
Gaurisagar Lake
Chandubi Lake
Rudrasagar Lake Sivasagar
Deepor Beel Bird Sanctuary
Son Beel
Maguri Motapung Beel
Silsako Lake
Chapnala Lake
 Saron Beel

Bihar
 Kanwar Lake Bird Sanctuary
 Ghora Katora

Chandigarh 
 Sukhna Lake

Gujarat
 Gopi Talav
 Hamirsar Lake
 Kankaria Lake
 Nal Sarovar
 Narayan Sarovar
 Sardar Sarovar Dam
 Thol Lake
 Vastrapur Lake
 Saputara Lake
 Bor talav
 Dharoi Dam
 Damodar Kund
 Sardar Sarovar Dam
 Gomti Lake
 Hamirsar Lake
 Shakoor Lake
 Soor Sagar Lake (Sursagar Lake)
Lakhota Lake

Haryana
 Badkhal Lake
 Blue Bird Lake
 Brahma Sarovar
 Damdama Lake
 Karna Lake
 Sannihit Sarovar
 Surajkund
 Tilyar Lake
 Bhindawas Lake

Himachal Pradesh

Bhrigu Lake (4235 m)
Chandra Taal (4300 m)
Chander Naun (4260 m)
Dashair Lake (4270 m)
Dal Lake
Dehnasar Lake (4280 m)
Dhankar Lake (4270 m)
Ghadhasaru Lake (3470 m)
Gobind Sagar
Kamrunag Lake (3334 m)
Kareri Lake (2934 m)
Lama Dal (3960 m)
Mahakali Lake (4080 m)
Manimahesh Lake (4080 m)
Nako Lake (3662 m)
Pong Dam Lake
Prashar Lake (2730 m)
Rewalsar Lake
Suraj Tal (4883 m)

Jammu and Kashmir
 Anchar Lake
 Brari Nambal
 Dal Lake
 Gadsar Lake
 Gangabal Lake
 Gil Sar
 Hokersar
 Kausar Nag
 Khanpursar
 Khushal Sar
 Manasbal Lake
 Mansar Lake
 Marsar Lake
 Nandan Sar Lake
 Sheshnag Lake
 Satsar Lake
 Tarsar Lake
 Tulian lake
 Vishansar Lake
 Wular Lake
 Nigeen Lake
 Nilnag Lake
 Nundkol Lake
 Manasbal Lake
 Krishansar Lake

Ladakh
 Tso Moriri
 Tso Kar
 Pangong Tso
 Kyagar Tso

Karnataka
Lakes in Bangalore
Mamadapur Badshah Lake
Bellandur Lake
Hebbal Lake
Jaraganahalli Lake
Lalbagh Lake
Madiwala Lake
Puttenahalli Lake (JP Nagar)
Puttenahalli Lake (Yelahanka)
sarakki lake
Ulsoor Lake
Varthur Lake
Yelahanka lake

Mysore City lakes
 Karanji lake
 Kukkarahalli lake 
 Lingambudhi Lake
Lakes in Davanagere District
Sulekere
Honnamana Kere
Pampa Sarovar

Kerala
 Ashtamudi Lake
 Kuttanad Lake
 Maanaanchira, Kozhikode
 Padinjarechira, Thrissur city
 Paravur Kayal
 Shasthamkotta lake
 Vadakkechira, Thrissur city
 Vanchikulam, Thrissur
 Vellayani Lake
 Vembanad Lake, longest lake of India
 Veli Lake

Madhya Pradesh
 Bhojtal
 Lower Lake, Bhopal
 Tawa Reservoir
Sagar Lake (Lakha Banjara Lake)

Maharashtra
 Gorewada Lake
 Khindsi Lake 
 Lonar Lake
 Pashan Lake
 Powai Lake
 Rankala Lake
 Salim Ali Lake
 Shivasagar lake
 Talao Pali
 Futala Lake
 Tansa Lake
 Tulsi Lake
 Upvan Lake
 Vaitarna Lake
 Venna Lake
 Vihar Lake
 Chatri Lake
Meherun Lake
Mastani Lake

Manipur
 Loktak Lake
 Pumlenpat
 Ikop Pat
 Loukoipat
 Yaralpat
 Laphupat
 Shilempat
 Keisampat (Extinct)
 Porompat (Extinct)
Zaimeng Lake
Zeilad Lake

Meghalaya
 Umiam Lake

Mizoram
 Palak Dïl
 Tam Dil

Odisha
 Victoria Sagar Lake
 Anshupa Lake
 Chilka Lake
 Kanjia Lake

Puducherry 
 Bahour Lake
 Ousteri Lake
 Velrampet Lake
 Nallambal Lake

Punjab
 Harike Wetland
 Kanjli Wetland
 Ropar Wetland

Rajasthan
 Balsamand lake
 Dhebar Lake / Jaisamand Lake
 Jal Mahal, Man Sagar lake
 Kaylana Lake, Kolayat
 Loonkaransar
 Nakki Lake
 Pachpadra Lake
 Pushkar Lake, Pushkar
 Rajsamand Lake
 Ramgarh Lake
 Sambhar Salt Lake
 Talwara Lake
 Ummed Sagar Bandh
 Siliserh Lake

Ajmer
 Ana Sagar Lake
 Lake Foy Sagar

Udaipur
 Fateh Sagar Lake
 Pichola lake
 Lake Badi
 Swaroop Sagar Lake
 Udaisagar Lake
 Govardhan Sagar Lake

Sikkim
 Gurudongmar Lake, highest lake of India
 Khecheopalri Lake 
 Lake Cholamu 
 Lake Tsongmo
 Samiti Lake
 South Lhonak Lake

Tamil Nadu

 Adambakkam Lake
 Coimbatore
 Singanallur Lake
 Ukkadam Lake Periyakulam Lake
 Berijam Lake
 Chembarambakkam Lake
 Kaliveli Lake
 Kodaikanal Lake
 Ooty Lake
 Perumal Eri
 Red Hills Lake
 Sholavaram Lake
 Veeranam Lake
 Maduranthakam Lake
 Tandi Lake

Telangana

 Bhadrakali Lake
 Durgam Cheruvu
 Himayat Sagar 
 Hussain Sagar
 Laknavaram Lake
 Mir Alam Tank
 Osman Sagar 
 Pakhal Lake
 Saroornagar Lake
 Shamirpet Lake
 Waddepally Lake
 Ramappa lake
 Gangaram Cheruvu
 Ameenpur Lake
 Fox Sagar Lake
 Gandigudem Cheruvu

Uttar Pradesh 
 Gobind Vallabh Pant Sagar, largest man–made lake of India
 Barua Sagar Tal
 Belasagar Lake
 Keetham Lake
 Ramgarh Tal Lake
 Bakhira Tal Lake
 Sarsai Jheel
 Moti Jheel
 Sheetal Jheel
 Surha Tal
 Fulhar Lake

Uttarakhand

West Bengal
 East Calcutta Wetlands
 Jore Pokhri
 Mirik Lake
 Rabindra Sarobar
 Rasikbil
 Santragachhi Lake
 Senchal Lake

See also 
 List of lakes
 Soda lake
 Water resources in India

References

External links
 

 
Lists by area